Kaohsiung Mass Rapid Transit Foreign Workers Scandal, also known as the KMRT Scandal, is a scandal that broke in August 2005, during the presidency of Chen Shui-bian. During the construction of the Kaohsiung Mass Rapid Transit, Thai workers hired for the job rioted to protest bad working conditions. During the subsequent investigation, it was found that foreign workers had been hired through a third party, despite project requirements mandating that workers be vetted directly by the government.

References 

2005 in Taiwan
Kaohsiung Metro
Labor in Taiwan
Economic history of Taiwan
August 2005 events in Asia
Taiwan–Thailand relations
Immigration-related protests
Riots and civil disorder in Asia
2005 protests
2005 scandals
Scandals in Taiwan